Ministry for Internal Affairs of Mordovia (МВД по Республике Мордовия) or the Police of Mordovia (Полиция Мордовии) is the main law enforcement organization of Mordovia, Russia.

The current Minister is Sergey Kozlov, he attained this position in 2005.

History
The Police in Mordovia were originally formed in 1811 as the Saransk Municipal Police (Саранская городская полиция). There primary functions were Population Security, Trade inspection, epidemic Service, fighting against alcoholic products, Fire Fighting, construction inspection, and crimes investigations.

In 1917 the Czarist police was dissolved and replaced by the Militsiya. In 1918 under the militsiya, the central investigations department (уголовного розыск) was introduced. In 1934 the police were called MKVD of Mordovia, and in 1946 they were renamed to Ministry for Internal Affairs (MVD).

In 1987 various special units were formed, as OMON (отряд милиции особого назначени), with special functions as public order and aid to the municipal authorities in case of Emergencies. In 1989 The Sixth Department for combating Organized Crime was established.

In 2011 the Militsiya was renamed to Politsiya.

External links
Official Website in Russian
Traffic Police in Mordovia

Politics of Mordovia
Mordovia
Mordovia